Kern Peak is a mountain peak in Tulare County, California in the Sierra Nevada. It is west of Olancha Peak, which is in the same mountain range. The climb to the top of this summit involves a long hike from any trailhead. The best time to climb the mountain is May to October.

Camping 
Several campsites are located along the routes to the summit. Some of these campsites are located by the South Fork Kern River. There are also some areas not designated for camping, but are able to be camped on. Permits are required to be able to camp in the Golden Trout Wilderness. Permits can be reserved ahead of time.

References 

Mountains of the Sierra Nevada (United States)
Mountains of Tulare County, California
Mountains of Northern California